Dipterocarpus eurynchus is a species of tree in the family Dipterocarpaceae. The tree is found in Borneo (except Sabah), Sumatra, Peninsular Malaysia and the Philippines. This species occurs in mixed dipterocarp forest on leached clay soils.

References

eurynchus
Trees of Sumatra
Trees of Peninsular Malaysia
Trees of Borneo
Trees of the Philippines
Critically endangered flora of Asia
Taxobox binomials not recognized by IUCN